Fusidic acid/betamethasone valerate is a combination drug with the active ingredients being fusidic acid (an antibiotic) and betamethasone valerate (a corticosteroid). It is a medical cream used for treatment of skin inflammation, eczema, or dermatitis that is also infected with bacteria sensitive to fusidic acid.

References

Ointments
Antibiotics
Corticosteroids